The Group for Social Dialogue (GDS) is a Romanian non-governmental organization whose stated mission is to protect and promote democracy, human rights and civil liberties. It was founded in January 1990 and issues the weekly magazine Revista 22.

On 31 December 1989, The Group for Social Dialogue – with only 15 members – organized a press conference at the InterContinental Bucharest in which participants announced the intentions of the group. Their constitution declaration specified the group’s intentions and the values shared by all the members.

In January 1990, it was the host of the first official visit in Romania of philanthropist George Soros.

The group pursues its goals mainly by engaging in dialogue with various society components, as well as the executive and legislative branches. The GDS is not a political organization, and stresses that it does not intend to become one. However it is noted for its support for the right wing.

The started a political magazine, Revista 22, on 20 January 1990.

Notable members
Călin Anastasiu
Vlad Alexandrescu
Sorin Alexandrescu
Gabriela Adameşteanu
Cătălin Avramescu
Radu Bercea
Theodor Baconschi
Magda Cârneci 
Mariana Celac
Vitalie Ciobanu 
Adrian Cioroianu
Eugen Ciurtin
Andrei Cornea
Doina Cornea
Livius Ciocârlie
Mircea Diaconu
Smaranda Enache
Radu Filipescu
Armand Goşu
Stere Gulea
Thomas Kleininger
Gabriel Liiceanu
Alexandru Lăzescu
Monica Macovei
Mircea Martin
Horea Murgu
Andrei Oișteanu
Marius Oprea
Anca Oroveanu
Rodica Palade
Răsvan Popescu
Horia Roman Patapievici
Dan Perjovschi
Andrei Pleșu
Cristian Preda
Victor Rebengiuc
Mihai Şora
Ana Şincai
Ioan Stanomir
Alin Teodorescu
Sorin Vieru
Alexandru Tocilescu
Vladimir Tismăneanu
Florin Turcanu
Ion Vianu
Şerban Rădulescu Zoner

References

External links
 Official site

Human rights organizations based in Romania
Organizations established in 1990
1990 establishments in Romania